Betty Bennett may refer to:

 Betty T. Bennett (1935–2006), American professor of literature
 Betty Bennett (singer) (1921–2020), American jazz singer